Nikolai Pokotylo (Rus: Николай Покотыло) (born May 25, 1981 in Öskemen, Kazakh SSR, Soviet Union (present Kazakhstan)) is a singer who placed fifth in SuperStar KZ, the Kazakh version of Pop Idol, shown by Perviy Kanal Evraziya.

SuperStar KZ performances
Semi Finals: Wildcards: Top 12: YouTop 11: Лейла by Nurlan & MuratTop 10: Про ЗайцевTop 9: Unchained Melody by The Righteous BrothersTop 8: ДжулияTop 7: You're My Heart, You're My Soul by Modern TalkingTop 6: ПаромщикTop 5: Every TimeTop 5: No Matter What by Boyzone

External links
Nikolai Pokotylo - Bio (In Russian)

1984 births
Living people
Idols (franchise) participants
21st-century Kazakhstani male singers
SuperStar KZ